Alexis Nahuel Messidoro (born 13 May 1997) is an Argentine professional footballer who plays as an midfielder for Indonesian Liga 1 club Persis Solo.

Career 
Messidoro is a youth exponent from Boca Juniors. On 12 April 2016, he made his first team debut in a league game against Aldosivi in a 4–1 home win. He started in the first eleven and scored his first goal after 54 minutes.

References

1997 births
Living people
Footballers from Buenos Aires
Argentine footballers
Association football midfielders
Argentine Primera División players
Primera Nacional players
Campeonato Brasileiro Série A players
Bolivian Primera División players
Uruguayan Primera División players
Venezuelan Primera División players
Super League Greece 2 players
Liga 1 (Indonesia) players
Boca Juniors footballers
Sport Boys Warnes players
Cruzeiro Esporte Clube players
Talleres de Córdoba footballers
Cerro Largo F.C. players
Estudiantes de Mérida players
Club Atlético Platense footballers
O.F. Ierapetra F.C. players
Persis Solo players
Argentine expatriate footballers
Argentine expatriate sportspeople in Bolivia
Argentine expatriate sportspeople in Brazil
Argentine expatriate sportspeople in Venezuela
Argentine expatriate sportspeople in Greece
Argentine expatriate sportspeople in Indonesia
Expatriate footballers in Bolivia
Expatriate footballers in Brazil
Expatriate footballers in Venezuela
Expatriate footballers in Greece
Expatriate footballers in Indonesia